The Ellis River is a  river in the White Mountains of New Hampshire in the United States.  It is a tributary of the Saco River, which flows to the Atlantic Ocean in Maine.

The Ellis River rises on the eastern slopes of Mount Washington, the highest peak in the northeastern United States.  Flowing south, it is quickly joined by the Cutler River flowing out of Tuckerman and Huntington ravines, passes over Crystal Cascade, and reaches the floor of Pinkham Notch.

The river leaves the level ground at the high point of the notch by dropping  over Glen Ellis Falls. The falls are a short walk from Route 16, the highway through the notch. A U.S. Forest Service parking area, not far from the top of the falls, gives access to a well-maintained, hard-surfaced, short trail hugging the river to a point at the top of the falls, where there is a lookout nearly straight down into the gorge, and then the trail proceeds by a steep descent of stairs to the deep pool at the base of the falls.

The river continues south into the town of Jackson, New Hampshire, through a gradually widening valley, where it is joined by Wildcat Brook. Leaving the small intervale at Jackson village, the Ellis River drops over a hydroelectric dam at Goodrich Falls and reaches the Saco River near the village of Glen in the town of Bartlett.

New Hampshire Route 16 follows the Ellis River from the height of land in Pinkham Notch south to Glen.

See also

List of rivers of New Hampshire

References

Rivers of New Hampshire
Mount Washington (New Hampshire)
Saco River
Rivers of Coös County, New Hampshire
Rivers of Carroll County, New Hampshire